Sweetheart's Dance is the fourth studio album by American country music singer Pam Tillis, released on April 26, 1994 via Arista Records. It is her highest ranking album on the Billboard charts, at number 6.

This album produced five singles: "Spilled Perfume", "When You Walk in the Room" (a cover of a Jackie DeShannon song), "Mi Vida Loca (My Crazy Life)", "I Was Blown Away" and "In Between Dances". Respectively, these reached #5, #2, #1, #16, and #3 on the Billboard Hot Country Singles & Tracks (now Hot Country Songs) charts. "I Was Blown Away" was withdrawn from radio after the Oklahoma City bombing in 1995.

Track listing

Personnel
As listed in liner notes.
 Mike Brignardello - bass guitar (4-8)
 Sam Bush - fiddle (2, 10)
 Mary Chapin Carpenter - background vocals (4)
 Ashley Cleveland - background vocals (9)
 Bob DiPiero - 12-string guitar (4)
 Dan Dugmore - acoustic guitar (1, 9), electric guitar (3, 10)
 Paul Franklin - steel guitar (4-8)
 Vince Gill - background vocals (7)
 Rob Hajacos - fiddle (4-8)
 Vicki Hampton - background vocals (9)
 John Barlow Jarvis - accordion (1), piano (2, 3, 9, 10)
 John Jorgenson - electric guitar (1, 3, 9), acoustic guitar solo (1), lead electric guitar (2, 10), mandolin (3)
 Mary Ann Kennedy - background vocals (5)
 Greg Leisz - steel guitar (1, 9), rhythm electric guitar (2), Dobro (3, 10)
 Liana Manis - background vocals (9)
 George Marinelli - electric guitar (4)
 Brent Mason - electric guitar (4-8)
 Terry McMillan - percussion (5), harmonica (6)
 Bill Monroe - mandolin (10)
 Steve Nathan - piano (4-8)
 Bobby Ogdin - synthesizer (5)
 Suzi Ragsdale - background vocals (1, 6)
 Kim Richey - background vocals (4)
 Milton Sledge - drums (1, 2, 3, 9, 10), percussion (9, 10)
 Harry Stinson - percussion (1), background vocals (2)
 Carrie Tillis - background vocals (10)
 Cindy Tillis Westmoreland - background vocals (10)
 Connie Tillis Howden - background vocals (10)
 Mel Tillis Jr. - background vocals (10)
 Pam Tillis - vocals, background vocals (1, 2, 3, 5, 6, 8, 9)
 Biff Watson - acoustic guitar (all tracks)
 Willie Weeks - bass guitar (1, 2, 3, 9, 10)
 Lonnie Wilson - drums (4-8), percussion (4)

Technical
 Chuck Ainlay - mixing
 Don Cobb - digital editing
 Steve Fishell - producer
 Carlos Grier - digital editing
 Graham Lewis - engineering
 Mike Poole - engineering
 Denny Purcell - mastering
 Pam Tillis - producer

Charts

Weekly charts

Year-end charts

Certifications

References

1994 albums
Arista Records albums
Pam Tillis albums